The Gillespie County Historical Society is a historical society founded in 1934 serving Gillespie County, Texas. It operates The Pioneer Museum of Fredericksburg, Texas, intended as "a memorial to celebrate a unique community that was created by early settlers to the Texas Hill Country."

Another history museum in Fredericksburg is the Fort Martin Scott Museum, which is run by the Fort Martin Scott Museum Association.

References

External links

 

History museums in Texas
Museums in Gillespie County, Texas
Organizations established in 1934
Historical societies in Texas